Hydrelia marginepunctata is a moth in the family Geometridae first described by William Warren in 1893. It is found in China, Nepal and Sikkim, India.

References

Moths described in 1893
Asthenini
Moths of Asia